Larsen is an unincorporated community in the town of Clayton, in Winnebago County, Wisconsin, United States.

History
A post office called Larsen has been in operation since 1898. The community was named for Philip Larsen, the first storekeeper there.

Religion
St Peter's Lutheran Church is a Christian church of the Wisconsin Evangelical Lutheran Synod in Larsen.

Transportation
The Larson Brothers Airport is located near Larsen.

Notes

Unincorporated communities in Winnebago County, Wisconsin
Unincorporated communities in Wisconsin